The PlayStation Mouse (US/UK: SCPH-1090, JP: SCPH-1030) is an input device for the PlayStation that allows the player to use a mouse as a method of control in compatible games. The mouse was released in Japan on December 3, 1994, the launch date of the PlayStation.

The mouse itself is a simple two-button ball mouse that plugs directly into the PlayStation controller port without adapters or conversions and is a fully supported Sony accessory. It was packaged along with a mouse mat bearing the PlayStation logo.

The mouse is mainly used in point-and-click adventures, strategy games, simulation games and visual novels. In later years, first-person shooters also make use of the peripheral to aim the player's view in the same manner as similar games on the PC. It is also used by the arcade lightgun shooting game Area 51 as an aiming device instead of a light gun compatibility.

A special Konami-branded edition of the mouse was released alongside the Japanese exclusive title Tokimeki Memorial: Forever With You.

Mouse packs for Disney's Winnie the Pooh Kindergarten and Disney's Winnie the Pooh Preschool were also released exclusively in Japan.

List of games compatible with the PlayStation Mouse

 A-Train
 Actua Pool
 Alien Resurrection
 Amerzone: The Explorer's Legacy
 Arcade's Greatest Hits: The Atari Collection 1
 Arcade's Greatest Hits: The Atari Collection 2
 Arcade Party Pak
 Area 51
 Arkanoid Returns
 Ark of Time
 Atari Anniversary Edition
 Atlantis: The Lost Tales
 Aztec: The Curse in the Heart of the City of Gold
 Backgammon
 Baldies
 Bedlam
 Breakout
 BreakThru!
 Broken Sword: The Shadow of the Templars
 Broken Sword II: The Smoking Mirror
 Chaos Control
 China: The Forbidden City Chronicles of the Sword City Bravo! Clock Tower: The First Fear Clock Tower Clock Tower II: The Struggle Within Command & Conquer: Red Alert Command & Conquer: Red Alert - Retaliation Constructor Cyberia Dark Seed Die Hard Trilogy Die Hard Trilogy 2: Viva Las Vegas Discworld Discworld II: Missing Presumed...!? Discworld Noir Disney's Winnie the Pooh Kindergarten Disney's Winnie the Pooh Preschool Dracula: The Resurrection Dracula 2: The Last Sanctuary Dune 2000 Egypt 1156 B.C.: Tomb of the Pharaoh Elemental Gearbolt Final Doom Front Mission Alternative Galaxian 3 Ghoul Panic Global Domination Help Charity Compilation Irritating Stick Jellyfish: The Healing Friend Jigsaw Madness Klaymen Klaymen: The Mystery of the Neverhood Las Vegas Dream 2 Lemmings & Oh No! More Lemmings Lemmings 3D Louvre: The Final Curse Mighty Hits Special Monopoly MTV Music Generator Myst My Disney Kitchen Necronomicon: The Dawning of Darkness Neorude Perfect Assassin Player Manager Player Manager Ninety Nine Policenauts Premier Manager 98 Premier Manager: Ninety Nine Premier Manager 2000 Prisoner of Ice
 Prism Land Story
 Project: Horned Owl
 Puchi Carat
 Quake II
 Railroad Tycoon II
 Rescue Shot
 Risk
 Riven: The Sequel to Myst
 RPG Maker
 Sentinel Returns
 Shanghai: Great Moments
 Shanghai: True Valor SilverLoad SimCity 2000 Snatcher Spin Jam Starblade Alpha Syndicate Wars Tempest X3 Theme Aquarium Time Crisis Tokimeki Memorial: Forever With You Tokimeki Memorial 2 Tokimeki Memorial Drama Series: Vol.1 - Nijiiro no Seisyun Tokimeki Memorial Drama Series: Vol.2 - Irodori no Love Song Tokimeki Memorial Selection: Fujisaki Shiori Transport Tycoon Ubik Virtual Pool Warhammer: Dark Omen Warzone 2100 X-COM: UFO Defense X-COM: Terror from the Deep Z''

Notes

References

PlayStation (console) accessories
Game controllers